Williamsburg is a city in Iowa County, Iowa, United States. The population was 3,346 at the time of the 2020 census. Williamsburg is known for Holden's Foundation Seeds, a foundation seed corn company, and Kinze Manufacturing, Inc., a farm implement manufacturer.  Aviation pioneer Eugene Ely was born outside Williamsburg.

History
Williamsburg was laid out in 1856. It was named for its founder, Richard Williams.

Geography
Williamsburg is located at  (41.664281, -92.012334).

Demographics

2010 census
At the 2010 census there were 3,068 people, 1,309 households, and 835 families living in the city. The racial makeup of the city was 98.3% White, 0.2% African American, 0.3% Asian, 0.3% from other races, and 0.8% from two or more races. Hispanic or Latino of any race were 1.5%.

Of the 1,309 households 32.2% had children under the age of 18 living with them, 53.2% were married couples living together, 7.3% had a female householder with no husband present, 3.4% had a male householder with no wife present, and 36.2% were non-families. 32.8% of households were one person and 16.2% were one person aged 65 or older. The average household size was 2.31 and the average family size was 2.93.

The median age was 39.1 years. 25.6% of residents were under the age of 18; 6.2% were between the ages of 18 and 24; 25.6% were from 25 to 44; 24.1% were from 45 to 64; and 18.4% were 65 or older. The gender makeup of the city was 47.0% male and 53.0% female.

2000 census
At the 2000 census there were 2,622 people, 1,072 households, and 687 families living in the city. The racial makeup of the city was 97.98% White, 0.11% African American, 0.04% Native American, 0.23% Asian, 0.11% Pacific Islander, 0.99% from other races, and 0.53% from two or more races. Hispanic or Latino of any race were 1.72%.

Of the 1,072 households 35.4% had children under the age of 18 living with them, 53.1% were married couples living together, 8.7% had a female householder with no husband present, and 35.9% were non-families. 31.4% of households were one person and 15.7% were one person aged 65 or older. The average household size was 2.41 and the average family size was 3.10.

The age distribution was 28.9% under the age of 18, 6.7% from 18 to 24, 28.9% from 25 to 44, 19.0% from 45 to 64, and 16.5% 65 or older. The median age was 37 years. For every 100 females, there were 87.8 males. For every 100 females age 18 and over, there were 84.3 males.

The median household income was $36,528 and the median family income  was $46,779. Males had a median income of $31,104 versus $24,091 for females. The per capita income for the city was $19,712. About 3.6% of families and 4.3% of the population were below the poverty line, including 3.4% of those under age 18 and 2.7% of those age 65 or over.

Education
Williamsburg is served by the Williamsburg Community School District.

Notable people 

 Robert Bauer, painter
 Austin Blythe, offensive lineman for Iowa Hawkeyes and Kansas City Chiefs
 Eugene Burton Ely, born near Williamsburg, was an aviation pioneer
 Harris Hull, (1909–1993) Brigadier General in the United States Air Force
 Harry E. Hull was a businessman who served in several public offices before becoming U.S. Representative
 William Shannahan was the third president of St. Ambrose University

References

External links
 Williamsburg Iowa Government

Cities in Iowa County, Iowa
Cities in Iowa
1856 establishments in Iowa